Weir Lake is a lake in census division 23 in Northern Manitoba, Canada. It is in the Hudson Bay drainage basin and is the source of the Weir River.

References

Lakes of Northern Manitoba